Damiella Nomenjanahary (born 22 June 1997) is a Malagasy judoka.

Career
Nomenjanahary competed at the 2021 World Judo Championships in Budapest in the 63kg category, but lost to
Sandrine Billiet of Cape Verde. Only 2 slots were available for African women at the 2020 Summer Games 63kg category and Nomenjanahary amassed enough ranking points to qualify for the games behind Billiet as the continent number two despite the Nigerian judoka association initially announcing Enku Ewa Ekuta had been selected in February, 2021. She was selected for the honour to be a Madagascan flag bearer at the opening ceremony in Tokyo. She was drawn to compete against Maria Centracchio who won the contest.

References

1997 births
Living people
Malagasy female judoka
Olympic judoka of Madagascar
Judoka at the 2020 Summer Olympics